Wilcox is an unincorporated community in Burleson County, Texas, United States. According to the Handbook of Texas, the community had a population of 40 in 2000. It is located within the Bryan-College Station metropolitan area.

History 
The first White settlers came to Wilcox in the mid-1820s, but the community itself did not come to fruition until the early 1880s. It is located within the vicinity of Henry W. Wilcox's home on the banks of Cottonwood Bayou. A post office was established at Wilcox in 1900 and remained in operation until 1924. It became one of the first communities in Burleson County to receive a telephone connection around 1940, with the line connecting to Snook. A church named Money Chapel is located on the west of the community. Its population was 50 in 1936 and had one business. Another business opened in 1952, but the population dropped to 40 in 2000.

Geography

Education 
Today, Wilcox is served by the Snook independent school District.

References

Unincorporated communities in Burleson County, Texas
Unincorporated communities in Texas
Bryan–College Station